KNEH-LP (97.3 FM) is a radio station broadcasting a religious format. Licensed to Helena, Montana, United States, the station serves the Helena area.  The station is currently owned by Helena Community Educational Association.

References

External links
 

NEH-LP
Radio stations established in 2006
NEH-LP